Kym Wilson (born 1 April 1973) is an Australian actress and former television host.

Career 
Wilson made her television debut playing a minor role in the 1985 mini-series Professor Poopsnagle's Steam Zeppelin. Her first major role was in the ABC TV mini-series Brides of Christ in 1991. She played Darcy Hudson in the popular medical drama A Country Practice from 1991 to 1993. Following her stint on A Country Practice she played guest roles in Heartbreak High and All Saints. Wilson also co-hosted the music program Video Smash Hits from 1992 to 1993, and was a panellist on the Seven Network game-show The Main Event in 1992.

In 1995, together with then boyfriend Jeremy Sims, Wilson formed the theatrical production company "Pork Chop Productions". In 1996 she had a starring role in the original McLeod's Daughters telefilm, which remains the highest rated television film of all time in Australia. Wilson did not reprise her role for the subsequent television series.

Wilson moved to the United States in 1998 to escape press attention over her alleged affair with and the death of Michael Hutchence, where she undertook a three-month acting scholarship assisted by the Winston Churchill Fellowship, which she had won before Hutchence's death on 22 November 1997.

Wilson appeared nude on the cover of the May 1999 edition of Australian Playboy, after she was no longer acting regularly in TV series. She previously appeared semi-naked in Black+White magazine.

Wilson provided voice acting for the 2002 video game Ty the Tasmanian Tiger and its 2004 and 2005 sequels.

Personal life 
Wilson was born in Brisbane, Queensland. She completed her secondary education at Stella Maris College, Manly. 

As of 2008, Wilson was a board member of Australians In Film, based in Los Angeles. She married Sean O'Byrne on 9 October 2009.

Awards

In 1992, Wilson won the Logie Award for "Most Popular New Talent", as well as being nominated for "Most Popular Actress in a Miniseries/Telemovie" the same year. She was nominated for Most Popular Actress" in 1993 and 1994.

Filmography

Film

Television

References

External links
 

1973 births
Australian television actresses
Living people
Logie Award winners